85th Plenary Session of the Indian National Congress will be held from February 24 to 26 2023 at the Rajyotsav ground near Tuta in Naya Raipur, Chhattisgarh.

Background and preparations

References 

 

Indian National Congress
Indian National Congress events
February 2023 events in India